Jaime del Conde Ugarte (born 25 April 1962) is a Mexican politician affiliated with the National Action Party. As of 2014 he served as Deputy of the LIX Legislature of the Mexican Congress representing Aguascalientes.

References

1962 births
Living people
Politicians from Mexico City
Members of the Chamber of Deputies (Mexico)
National Action Party (Mexico) politicians
Instituto Tecnológico Autónomo de México alumni
21st-century Mexican politicians